Dronten is a municipality and a town in the central Netherlands, in the province of Flevoland.

History 
Plans for the municipality of Dronten were made in the early half of the 1950s; real plans for the town of Dronten (the municipality's center) were revealed in 1958.

The foundations for the town were laid in 1960. Right from the start there was a discussion whether Dronten was to become a town or a city. The first plans assumed 15,000 inhabitants, while later plans foresaw a growth to 30,000 inhabitants. The first plans for the municipality assumed ten smaller villages situated around the central town (in this case, Dronten). The number of villages was reduced because of increased motorized traffic and experiences gained in developing the Noordoostpolder, where a similar municipality had already been built. Eventually, it was decided that there were to be two smaller villages (Biddinghuizen and Swifterbant) and one larger town (Dronten).

On 1 January 1972, Dronten was given its official name.

In 1995, Dronten hosted in Biddinghuizen the 18th World Scout Jamboree. 28,960 Scouts and staff members from 166 countries and territories participated this event.

Population centers 
Biddinghuizen
Dronten
Swifterbant

Topography 

Dutch Topographic map of Dronten (town), March 2014.

Transportation 

Dronten has a railway station on the Lelystad-Zwolle railway.

The majority of velomobile manufacturers in the world are based in Dronten. They include Alligt, velomobiel.nl and InterCityBike.

Entertainment 
Biddinghuizen contains the theme park Walibi Holland.

Sister city relations 
 Ōgata, Akita, Japan (friendship city)

Notable people 

 Patrick Paauwe (born 1975), Dutch former professional footballer with 451 caps
 Cees Paauwe (born 1977), Dutch former football goalkeeper with over 100 caps
 Bertolf Lentink (born 1980), Dutch singer/songwriter who plays guitar and piano
 Ricardo Talu (born 1993), Dutch-Angolan professional footballer
 Hakim Ziyech (born 1993), Dutch-Moroccan professional footballer, currently playing for Chelsea F.C.
 Beitske Visser (born 1995), Dutch female racing driver

References

External links 

Official website

 
Municipalities of Flevoland
Populated places in Flevoland